{{DISPLAYTITLE:Bradykinin receptor B2}}

Bradykinin receptor B2 is a G-protein coupled receptor for bradykinin, encoded by the BDKRB2 gene in humans.

Mechanism
The B2 receptor is a G protein-coupled receptor, probably coupled to Gq and Gi. Gq stimulates phospholipase C to increase intracellular free calcium and Gi inhibits adenylate cyclase. Furthermore, the receptor stimulates the mitogen-activated protein kinase pathways. It is ubiquitously and constitutively expressed in healthy tissues.

The B2 receptor forms a complex with angiotensin converting enzyme (ACE), and this is thought to play a role in cross-talk between the renin-angiotensin system (RAS) and the kinin–kallikrein system (KKS). The heptapeptide angiotensin (1-7) also potentiates bradykinin action on B2 receptors.

Kallidin also signals through the B2 receptor. An antagonist for the receptor is Hoe 140 (icatibant).

Function
The 9 amino acid bradykinin peptide elicits several responses including vasodilation, edema, smooth muscle spasm and nociceptor stimulation.

Gene
Alternate start codons result in two isoforms of the protein.

See also
 Bradykinin receptor

References

Further reading

External links
 
 

G protein-coupled receptors